Jasmin Sports Hall (Macedonian: "Спортска Сала Јасмин") is a multi-purpose indoor sports arena located in Kavadarci, North Macedonia and seats 2,500 spectators.

The arena is used for basketball by KK Feni Industries. In May 2011, it hosted the Final Four of the Balkan International Basketball League. It has also been used for concerts and handball by GRK Tikveš.

References

External links 
Arena Information

Indoor arenas in North Macedonia
Multi-purpose stadiums in North Macedonia
Basketball venues in North Macedonia
Handball venues in North Macedonia
Sport in Kavadarci